Justice Newman may refer to:

Alfred Newman (jurist) (1834–1898), associate justice of the Wisconsin Supreme Court
Frank C. Newman (1917–1996), associate justice of the Supreme Court of California
Oscar W. Newman (1867–1928), associate justice of the Ohio Supreme Court
Sandra Schultz Newman (born 1938), associate justice of the Pennsylvania Supreme Court

See also
Linda K. Neuman (fl. 1980s–2000s), associate justice of the Iowa Supreme Court
William A. Neumann (born 1944), associate justice of the North Dakota Supreme Court
Judge Newman (disambiguation)